Pamelia Center is a hamlet and census-designated place (CDP) in Jefferson County, New York, United States. Its population was 264 as of the 2010 census. The community is located at the junction of New York State Route 37 and New York State Route 342.

Geography
Pamelia Center is in central Jefferson County in the town of Pamelia. Interstate 81 runs along the western edge of the community, with access from Exit 48 (NY 342), and Interstate 781 runs through the northern part, with access from I-81 only. I-81 leads south  to Watertown, the county seat, and north  to the Canada–United States border at the St. Lawrence River. I-781 leads east  to Fort Drum.

Demographics

References

Hamlets in Jefferson County, New York
Hamlets in New York (state)
Census-designated places in Jefferson County, New York
Census-designated places in New York (state)